The Soberton and Newtown Millennium Walk 2000 is a 10-mile circular footpath through Hampshire, England around villages of Soberton and Newtown.

Sections of the footpath are shared with The King's Way, Pilgrims' Trail, Wayfarers Walk and Meon Valley Trail.

The entire route is waymarked by metal and plastic disks found attached to wooden and metal posts, trees and street furniture.

External links
Hampshire County Council

See also
Recreational walks in Hampshire
Long-distance footpaths in the UK

Footpaths in Hampshire
Buildings and structures celebrating the third millennium